Yoko Inada (born 6 September 1969) is a Japanese sport shooter who competed in the 1996 Summer Olympics, in the 2000 Summer Olympics, and in the 2004 Summer Olympics.

References

1969 births
Living people
Japanese female sport shooters
ISSF pistol shooters
Olympic shooters of Japan
Shooters at the 1996 Summer Olympics
Shooters at the 2000 Summer Olympics
Shooters at the 2004 Summer Olympics
Shooters at the 1994 Asian Games
Shooters at the 1998 Asian Games
Shooters at the 2006 Asian Games
Shooters at the 2010 Asian Games
Shooters at the 2014 Asian Games
Asian Games medalists in shooting
Asian Games silver medalists for Japan
Asian Games bronze medalists for Japan
Medalists at the 1994 Asian Games
Medalists at the 2006 Asian Games
20th-century Japanese women
21st-century Japanese women